Mobley is an unincorporated community in Wetzel County, West Virginia, United States.

References 

Unincorporated communities in West Virginia
Unincorporated communities in Wetzel County, West Virginia